Association Sportive Oussou Saka is a football club in Benin, playing in the town of Porto-Novo. They play in the Beninese first division, the Benin Premier League.

Notable players

Stadium
Currently, the team plays at the 35,000 capacity Stade Charles de Gaulle.

League participations
 Benin Premier League: 2011–
 Benin Second Division: ????–2011

References

External links
Soccerway
Logo
Calciozz

Football clubs in Benin
Sport in Porto-Novo